National Route 242 is a paved highway, which is located in the Picunches Department, in the Argentine province of Neuquén. Until 2004, this section belonged to National Route 22. The route continues in Chile as Route CH-181.

Old Route
National Route 242 was included in the original national route plan of 3 September 1935. It began to be built in 1951 and finished in 1953 with its  of gravel, this route passed through the towns of General Roca, Chasicó, Ingeniero Jacobacci and Ñorquincó in the Río Negro Province.

Before the inauguration, of the bridge there was a raft service that had been operating since the end of 1908, being completely renovated and reopened on 4 September 2006.

Through National Decree 1595 of 1979, this road passed into provincial jurisdiction, for which the name was changed to Provincial Route 6.

References

National roads in Neuquén Province